Kirovsky is an urban locality (an urban-type settlement) and the administrative center of Kirovsky District of Primorsky Krai, Russia, located  east of the China–Russia border. Population:

History
It was established in 1891 as Uspenka and was granted urban-type settlement status in 1939.

References

Urban-type settlements in Primorsky Krai
Populated places established in 1891
1891 establishments in the Russian Empire